Most Wanted is a 2011 Oriya film directed by Sushant Mani.

Plot
An innocent Abhay Mohanty comes to city with dreams of a decent job and a beautiful life. In circumstances he has to fight the local goons. His ambitions leads him to the criminal world. He becomes Baba, the Don of the dons. He becomes the most wanted in police file.

Cast
 Anubhav Mohanty as Abhaya Mohanty / Baba
 Megha Ghosh as Monika James
 Mihir Das as Albert James
 Minaketan as Babu Bhai
 Pushpa Panda as Abhaya's mother
 Samaresh Routray as Mustaq Bhai
 Baisakhi Mohanty as Minu
 Papu Pam Pam as Computer Behera
 Jiban Panda as Babu Bhai's assistant
 Hara Rath as Topi
 Satwaki Mishra as Inspector M. Baxi

References

External links
 

2011 films
2010s Odia-language films
Films directed by Susant Mani